Dusicyon avus is an extinct species of cerdocyonine canid in the genus Dusicyon, native to South America during the Pleistocene and Holocene epochs. It was medium to large, about the size of a German shepherd. It was closely related to the Falkland Islands wolf (Dusicyon australis), which descended from a population of D. avus. It appears to have survived until very recently, perhaps 400 years ago.

Range 
Dusicyon avus range extended through the Pampas and Patagonia in the south-central and southern parts of South America, with an estimated range of around 762 351 km². Its fossils have been found in the Luján Formation of Argentina, the Chui Formation of Brazil, the Milodón Cave in Chile and the Sopas Formation of Uruguay.

Diet and ecology 
Its diet seems to have been more carnivorous than extant foxes based on δ13C and δ15N values, probably mostly preying on small mammals but also scavenging on large carcasses. This is in contrast the warrah, whose diet was restricted to the seabirds and seal pups available on the Falkland Islands. Morphologically, D. avus and D. australis are most similar to jackals, suggesting a similar ecological niche.

Relationship to humans 
A grave of the late second millennium BCE at Loma de los Muertos in General Conesa, Río Negro Argentina contains a sub-adult D. avus, buried in a human mortuary context in a comparable manner to adjacent human burials. It may have been kept as a pet and been considered part of the human social group.

Extinction

Dating of extinction 
Dusicyon avus, according to earlier estimates, became extinct around 1000 BCE, with possibilities that it became extinct as recently as 500 – 300 years BP. Recent research confirms more recent dates, with the last appearance datum in the Pampean Region being 700 BP (1232–1397 AD) and southernmost Patagonia at 400 years BP (1454–1626 AD).

Charles Darwin in The Voyage of the Beagle stated that "many sealers, Gauchos, and Indians, who have visited these islands [the Falklands], all maintain that no such animal [the warrah] is found in any part of South America" suggesting that it was unlikely to have been alive at this time. It is possible, but as yet unproven, that some populations of D. avus may have persisted until the time of European contact. Forty years before the introduction of the gray fox on Tierra del Fuego, there are some ethnographic references to the existence of two species of foxes there. Around 1900, the indigenous Ona were recorded as recognizing two varieties of foxes, one of which grew to unusual size. If the "big fox" was D. avus, this would indicate that it survived until the 20th century, at least in this location. In 1871 George Musters wrote a description of encountering a fox in Patagonia similar to a warrah, which may have been an account of this species.

Reasons for extinction 
The extinction of D. avus as opposed to the naive D. australis is mysterious, as there is no clear reason why a generalised medium sized canid would go extinct, especially at such a late date after the Quaternary extinction event. There is no compelling evidence that climatic change was the cause of the extinction, nor any evidence that hybridisation with domestic dogs was the cause, as the skull morphology and DNA is consistent from the Late Pleistocene through the Holocene. Dusicyon was used for ritual purposes by aboriginal peoples in the Late Holocene, and appears to have a high symbolic value and its remains, usually teeth, are found in many archaeological sites. D. avus, despite its wide range, has a low genetic diversity in tested samples, suggesting a possible low population or genetic bottleneck before extinction. It is likely that a combination of both climatic and anthropogenic factors was the cause of their demise.

References 

Dusicyon
Extinct mammals of South America
Pleistocene mammals of South America
Lujanian
Pleistocene Argentina
Fossils of Argentina
Pleistocene Brazil
Fossils of Brazil
Pleistocene Chile
Fossils of Chile
Pleistocene Uruguay
Fossils of Uruguay
Fossil taxa described in 1866
Mammals described in 1866
Taxa named by Hermann Burmeister